Sean Pedulla (born October 10, 2002) is an American college basketball player for the Virginia Tech Hokies of the Atlantic Coast Conference (ACC).

High school career 
Pedulla attended Edmond Memorial High School in Edmond, Oklahoma where he made two all-state teams. A three-star recruit ranked the nation's 140th best prospect, he committed to play college basketball at Virginia Tech.

College career 
Pedulla served as rotational player as a freshman averaging 5.4 points per game and shooting 45% from three-point range. In Virginia Tech's NCAA Tournament game against Texas, he scored 19 points. As a sophomore Pedulla has emerged as a star for the Hokies, winning the 2022 Basketball Hall of Fame Invitational MVP and leading the Hokies in scoring.

References

External links 
 Virginia Tech Hokies bio

2002 births
Living people
American men's basketball players
Basketball players from Oklahoma
Edmond Memorial High School alumni
Sportspeople from Edmond, Oklahoma
Virginia Tech Hokies men's basketball players
Point guards